{{DISPLAYTITLE:C21H20O6}}
The molecular formula C21H20O6 may refer to:

 Cannflavin B, a prenylflavonoid
 Curcumin, a curcuminoid
 7-O-Methylluteone, a prenylated isoflavone

Molecular formulas